is a video game based on the Yu-Gi-Oh! series, developed by Konami and released on PlayStation 2 format on September 6, 2001, in Japan. It is the first game from the series to be released on PlayStation 2 format.

Upon its release, Yu-Gi-Oh! The Duelists of Roses received mixed reviews from most game critics, with many critics praising the game for its graphic design and appeal, but criticizing its tedious gameplay and lack of fair challenge. It was a commercial success, among the best-selling PlayStation 2 games with over  copies sold worldwide. In mid-2006, The Duelists of the Roses was named a PlayStation 2 Greatest Hits title.

Game Mechanics
 
Each duel in the game takes place on a 7×7 table, with each player commanding a "Deck Leader" that acts as the representation of their life points as well as the means through which cards are played from the hand—one card each turn can be placed on the board in a space adjacent to the deck leader. Each card on the field as well as the deck leader itself can be moved one horizontal or vertical space each turn. When two monster cards on the field collide with each other, they are flipped face-up, and a battle takes place in the same manner as the trading card game, with life points being subtracted appropriately. The duel ends when one player's life points are reduced to zero or when a player ends a turn with their deck leader completely surrounded by enemy monsters in their summoning areas. A duel also ends after 100 turns have elapsed, at which point the player with the most remaining life points is declared the winner.

Monsters can be "promoted" with use in duels. When monsters survive face-up on the field, destroy enemy monsters, or inflict life point damage to the opponent, they gain experience (monster experience is hidden). When a monster accumulates enough experience, it will be promoted to the next rank. A monster must be promoted at least once in order to act as a deck leader. Some deck leaders have special abilities based on their type and rank, which include raising the strength of nearby monsters, increasing life points by a small number each turn, or being able to move two spaces each turn instead of just one.

A deck of exactly 40 cards is required to duel. Each card in the game has a "deck cost", which is a value given to a card based on its strength. The game adds difficulty by forcing the player to have a lower overall deck cost than their opponent in order to duel that opponent, essentially forcing the player to have a weaker deck. Cards are obtained mainly through the "graveyard slots", which is a slot machine that appears after each win allowing the player to obtain cards from an opponent's deck that were sent to the graveyard during the duel. Cards can also be obtained using codes in the deck builder menu or through "reincarnation", which is where owned cards can be sacrificed to give three different cards of a slightly lower deck cost. Reincarnation becomes available once after every 5 completed duels, win or loss.

Each space on the 7x7 duel board has a certain terrain. Each type of monster has at least one favored terrain that gives that monster an extra 500 ATK and DEF bonus when engaged in battle on that terrain. Each type of monster also has at least one disfavored terrain that reduces the ATK and DEF of that monster by 500 points. There are also three special terrains: Labyrinth, which no cards are able to move onto except for a few monsters with special effects; crush, which instantly destroys any monster with 1500 or more ATK; and toon, which weakens every monster in the game except for toon monsters. Terrains include normal, forest, meadow, dark, sea, wasteland, mountain, toon, crush, and labyrinth.

Plot
The game is very loosely based on the real-world Wars of the Roses, a series of wars fought between the House of Lancaster and the House of York over control of England in the 15th century. Yami Yugi (Yugi Mutou in the English anime and the original Japanese adaptations) assumes the identity of the head of the Tudor dynasty, Henry Tudor, while Seto Kaiba represents the head of the Yorkist clan force as Christian Rosenkreuz. Other characters from the anime similarly assume the roles and names of others who featured in the conflict.

The player assumes control of the "Rose Duelist", who is summoned from an unknown time period to the year 1485 by a druid of the Lancastrian forces to assist them in defeating the Yorkists and regaining control of the throne. Both sides possess eight "rose cards" which have sorcerous powers. The Lancastrians wish to obtain the Yorkists' white rose cards because Seto's forces are using their power to create a barrier that protects their territory, while the Yorkists wish to obtain the Lancastrians' red rose cards because Seto needs all 16 rose cards together to attempt a forbidden "rose summoning" that would give the Yorkists great power. The Rose Duelist also needs all 16 cards together to conjure enough power to go back to their proper time period, and so the player is forced to pick a side.

If the Lancastrians are sided with, the Rose Duelist obtains the white rose cards by battling the Yorkist forces who are represented by antagonists from the Yu-Gi-Oh! series such as Maximillion Pegasus, Weevil Underwood, and Rex Raptor. The Rose Duelist finally defeats Seto for the last rose card at Stonehenge, but the victory is short-lived as Seto reveals that the power released from their duel (along with all of the rose cards brought to the site by the Rose Duelist) has fulfilled the requirements for the great summoning, and that he feigned allegiance to the Yorkists to force the Lancastrians to summon the Rose Duelist in the first place. Seto then summons Manawyddan fab Llyr, a powerful mythological figure known as the card guardian, who Seto plans to use to ensure his rule over England. The Rose Duelist defeats Manawyddan fab Llyr and banishes him from the time period, securing victory for the Lancastrians. The epilogue states that Yugi was crowned as the king of England and that it is unknown whether or not the Rose Duelist was ever returned to the time period whence they were summoned.

If the Yorkists are sided with, the Rose Duelist battles protagonists from the Yu-Gi-Oh! series such as Joey Wheeler, Téa Gardner, and Yugi himself. After all of the rose cards are obtained, Seto performs the rose summoning at Stonehenge, again summoning Manawyddan fab Llyr. This time, however, Manawyddan reveals himself to be the brother of Nitemare from Yu-Gi-Oh! Forbidden Memories and is furious that they summoned his brother in Egypt then locked him away again. The Rose Duelist is forced to defeat Manawyddan fab Llyr to undo the summoning. After the duel, Seto informs the Rose Duelist that he has been long searching for a true Card Guardian because an ancestor of his entered into a pact with one long ago (again referencing Forbidden Memories). Seto leaves the Rose Duelist with his white rose pendant and his forces leave England, allowing the Lancastrians to gain control of the throne.

Cast

Lancastrians
 Yugi Mutou as Henry Tudor, later Henry VII of England
 Téa Gardner as Elizabeth of York
 Tristan Taylor as Thomas Grey
 Mai Valentine as Lady Margaret Beaufort
 Joey Wheeler as Christopher Urswick
 Shadi as John Morton
 Ryo Bakura as Jack Cade
 Solomon Muto as Jasper Tudor

Yorkists
 Seto Kaiba as Christian Rosenkreuz
 Weevil Underwood
 Rex Raptor
 Bonz
 Bandit Keith
 Meikyū Brothers
 Player Killer of Darkness (also known as PaniK)
 Maximillion Pegasus as Thomas Stanley, 1st Earl of Derby
 Ishizu Ishtar
 Slysheen as Richard III of England

Reception

Sales
In Japan, the game had initially sold over 68,420 copies, and sold a total of 76,248 units in the country. After releasing overseas, it went on to become a worldwide success.

In the United States, by July 2006, Duelists of the Roses had sold 950,000 copies and earned $33 million. Next Generation ranked it as the 60th highest-selling game launched for the PlayStation 2, Xbox or GameCube between January 2000 and July 2006 in that country. According to The Magic Box, Yu-Gi-Oh! The Duelists of the Roses had sold over 1.11 million copies in North America.

In the United States and Europe, the game sold  units . The game thus sold a total of  copies worldwide.

Critical response

Yu-Gi-Oh! The Duelists of the Roses received "mixed" reviews according to video game review aggregator Metacritic,scoring 59/100 from 14 critic reviews—11 mixed reviews, 2 positive reviews, and 1 negative review.

References

External links
 

2001 video games
Digital collectible card games
Konami games
PlayStation 2 games
PlayStation 2-only games
Video games developed in Japan
Duelists of the Roses 2